All's Well, Ends Well 1997 or abbreviated as AWEW 1997 (97家有囍事) is a 1997 Hong Kong comedy film directed by Alfred Cheung, starring Stephen Chow, Raymond Wong and Francis Ng.

Plot
Kung (Stephen Chow) is the spoiled youngest brother of three: no job, no education, plenty of money, plenty of girlfriends, and a good home, whom he shares with the two brothers Lo Leung and Fei, his sister-in-law Yinsu (Lo Leung's unattractive wife), and his wise father, Mr. Lo.  On his upcoming birthday, as a cruel but well-executed prank, Leung and Fei will feign a lottery win worth $30 million using a useless ticket and a recorded tape bearing the lottery pick from a previous night, all as Kung's birthday present.  Excessive greed causes Kung to fall for it, and he immediately (after trying to fool his family so he himself can have all the money) goes out with a selected girlfriend, Gigi, and hits it off at a night club.  Instead he runs afoul of Triad member Brother Smartie, who wants a game of dice.  Kung easily loses $1 million, as well as $5000 to Gigi, and he relies on his "winnings" in order to pay it all back.  When he finally discovers he never won the lottery (much to his shock and dismay), he decides to fake being mentally retarded, a feat which he pulls off quite well.  Then he learns he gains more benefits that way, so he chooses to remain mentally ill for the time being.  However, he has to learn the true meaning of life and to take what life has to offer but not ask for more.

Cast
 Stephen Chow - Lo Kung
 Raymond Wong - Lo Leung
 Francis Ng - Lo Fei
 Roy Chiao - Mr. Lo 
 Christine Ng - Yinsu
 Jacklyn Wu - Shenny
 Christy Chung - Little Shien
 Gigi Lai - Gigi
 Amanda Lee - Monalisa or Karen Kam/Herself
 Simon Lui - Brother Smartie
 Emil Chau - Long
 Law Ho Kai - Mr. Ting
 Law Koon-Lan - Mrs. Ting
 Alfred Cheung - Mental patient
 Turbo Kong - Left hand man
 Paw Hee-ching - Shenny's mum
 Josie Ho - Girlfriend
 Diana Pang - Girlfriend
 Leslie Cheung - Himself (cameo)
 Pauline Yeung - Herself (cameo)
 Teddy Robin - Himself (cameo)
 Law Kar-ying - Himself (cameo)
 Michael Chow - Himself (cameo)
 Wong Yuk-Long (cameo)

See also
 All's Well, Ends Well (1992)
 All's Well, Ends Well Too (1993)
 All's Well, Ends Well 2009 (2009)

References

External links

All's Well, Ends Well 1997 at chinesemov.com

1997 films
1990s Cantonese-language films
1997 comedy films
Hong Kong comedy films
Chinese New Year films
1990s Hong Kong films